The northern scrub robin (Drymodes superciliaris) is a species of bird in the family Petroicidae.  It is found in northern Cape York Peninsula. It was found to be genetically distinct from the Papuan scrub robin, which were thought to be members of the same species.

A putative subspecies D. s. colcloughi, known as the Roper River scrub robin, was described by Gregory Mathews in 1914 from specimens supposedly collected from the Northern Territory of Australia.  However, there have been no further records from the area, the provenance of the specimens has been questioned, and the taxon is controversial.

References

northern scrub robin
Birds of Cape York Peninsula
northern scrub robin
Taxa named by John Gould
Taxonomy articles created by Polbot